Alain Schultz (born 17 February 1983) is a Swiss association footballer who plays and works as an assistant manager for the reserve team of FC Wohlen.

References

External links
Football.ch profile

1983 births
Living people
Swiss men's footballers
FC Aarau players
FC Wohlen players
Grasshopper Club Zürich players
Swiss Super League players
Swiss Challenge League players
Association football forwards